Typhoon Krosa, known in the Philippines as Typhoon Vinta, was a typhoon that made landfall in the northern Philippines in late October 2013. Forming on October 27 near Guam, the storm slowly intensified while moving westward. Krosa developed an eye and became a typhoon before striking Luzon on October 31. Typhoon Krosa stalled and encountered unfavorable conditions, resulting in quick weakening. By November 3, it had weakened to tropical storm status, and was no longer being warned on by the next day. In northern Luzon, Krosa damaged 32,000 houses, including 3,000 that were destroyed, and caused four fatalities. High winds and rainfall left ₱277 million (PHP, $6.4 million USD) in damage.

Not long after Krosa dissipated, the Philippines were again struck by the more devastating and extremely violent Typhoon Haiyan, which caused much more damage and destruction.

Meteorological history

On October 27, an area of convection with a broad circulation persisted southeast of Guam, and slowly consolidated due to moderate wind shear and westerly outflow. At 2100 UTC on October 28, the Philippine Atmospheric, Geophysical and Astronomical Services Administration (PAGASA) began issuing advisories on the depression, giving it the local name Vinta. The next day, the JMA upgraded the depression to Tropical Storm Krosa, and the Joint Typhoon Warning Center (JTWC) also classified it as Tropical Depression 29W. By that time, the storm was moving steadily westward due to the subtropical ridge to the north. With the warm waters of the Philippine Sea, lessening wind shear, and improving outflow, Krosa gradually strengthened, and the JTWC also upgraded Krosa to tropical storm status on October 30 after an eye feature developed.

While approaching northern Luzon on October 29, Krosa quickly intensified as the initial eye feature organized into a well-defined eye. Late on October 30, the JTWC upgraded Krosa to typhoon status, and the next day, both PAGASA and JMA followed suit. On October 31, Krosa made landfall in northeastern Luzon near Cagayan, and developed a symmetric eyewall while initially moving over land. Land interaction weakened the eye by the time Krosa emerged into the South China Sea late on October 31. The next day, PAGASA discontinued advisories after the typhoon exited the region. Convection rebuilt around the center, with continued favorable conditions allowing for restrengthening.

After remaining nearly stationary, Krosa began moving steadily to the west-southwest due to a new ridge. The convection continued to weaken due to continued shear and cooler waters from upwelling, and Krosa deteriorated to tropical storm status on November 3. The next day, the JTWC issued its final advisory after the circulation became exposed from the convection. Also on November 4, the JMA downgraded Krosa to tropical depression status off the northeast Vietnam coast. The system dissipated at 0000 UTC on November 5.

Preparations and impact

The agency noted for the potential for flooding and landslides. High winds knocked down trees across Luzon, and left about 80% of Cagayan province without power, as well as some areas without internet or cellphone service. Portions of the Pan-Philippine Highway were blocked, and in Lal-Lo, Cagayan, a car crashed into a gasoline truck due to power outages. Agriculture damage was estimated at ₱273 million (US$6.31 million), occurring just before the start of the harvest. Across the island, the typhoon damaged 37,523 houses, including 3,897 that were destroyed, forcing 65,648 people to evacuate to storm shelters. Overall, Krosa killed four people in the Philippines, and left ₱277 million (US$6.4 million) in damage. After the storm, workers quickly restored power lines, while the government provided monetary assistance to storm-ravaged families, after Cagayan was declared a state of calamity. Members of the Philippine military and Department of Public Works and Highways worked to clean up following the storm.

The China National Meteorological Centre issued a "yellow alert", the second-lowest of the four level warning system, for Hainan due to the threat of the storm. The agency recommended boats to return to port. Agencies in Vietnam also warned for the potential of heavy rainfall due to the dissipating Tropical Depression Krosa, and released water from three dams to prevent overflow.

See also
Typhoon Nina (1987)
Typhoon Cimaron (2006) – took similar track across Luzon and the South China Sea
Typhoon Nuri (2008) – similar typhoon that struck northern Luzon
Typhoon Usagi (2013)
Tropical Storm Aere (2016)
Typhoon Mangkhut (2018) – struck northern Luzon as a category 5 typhoon causing widespread damage.

Notes

References

External links

JMA General Information of Typhoon Krosa (1329) from Digital Typhoon
JMA Best Track Data of Typhoon Krosa (1329) 
JTWC Best Track Data of Typhoon 29W (Krosa)
29W.KROSA from the U.S. Naval Research Laboratory

Typhoons
2013 disasters in the Philippines
Typhoons in the Philippines
2013 Pacific typhoon season
Krosa